In the mathematical subject of geometric group theory, the Švarc–Milnor lemma   (sometimes also called Milnor–Švarc lemma, with both variants also sometimes spelling Švarc as  Schwarz)  is a statement which says that a group , equipped with a "nice" discrete isometric action on a metric space , is  quasi-isometric to .

This result goes back, in different form, before the notion of  quasi-isometry was formally introduced, to the work of Albert S. Schwarz (1955) and John Milnor (1968).  Pierre de la Harpe called the Švarc–Milnor lemma  "the fundamental observation in geometric group theory" because of its importance for the subject. Occasionally the name "fundamental observation in geometric group theory" is now used for this statement, instead of calling it the Švarc–Milnor lemma; see, for example, Theorem 8.2 in the book of Farb and Margalit.

Precise statement

Several minor variations of the statement of the lemma exist in the literature (see the Notes section below). Here we follow the version given in the book of Bridson and Haefliger (see Proposition 8.19 on p. 140 there).

Let  be a group acting by isometries on a proper length space  such that the action is properly discontinuous and cocompact.

the orbit map

is a quasi-isometry.

Sometimes a properly discontinuous cocompact isometric action of a group  on a proper geodesic metric space  is called a geometric action.

Explanation of the terms

is finite.

Under the other assumptions of the Švarc–Milnor lemma, the cocompactness condition is equivalent to the existence of a closed ball  in  such that

Examples of applications of the Švarc–Milnor lemma

For Examples 1 through 5 below see pp. 89–90 in the book of de la Harpe.
Example 6 is the starting point of the part of the paper of Richard Schwartz.

 For every  the group  is quasi-isometric to the Euclidean space .
 If  is a closed connected oriented surface of negative Euler characteristic then the fundamental group  is quasi-isometric to the hyperbolic plane .

References

Geometric group theory
Metric geometry